Prečno is a settlement in the Ivanić-Grad town of Zagreb County, Croatia. As of 2011, it had a population of 98 people(as of 2011).

References

Populated places in Zagreb County